Maysa Leak (born August 17, 1966) is an American jazz singer better known by her mononym Maysa. She is well known by fans of smooth jazz both for her solo work and her work with the British band Incognito.

Early life and career
Leak attended Milford Mill High School in western Baltimore County.  After high school, she studied music at Morgan State University in Baltimore City and graduated with a degree in classical performance. There she performed as a member of the world-famous Morgan State University Choir under the direction of the late Nathan Carter. Leak met performer Stevie Wonder during a college performance.

After receiving her degree from Morgan State University, Maysa headed to Southern California to perform with Stevie Wonder’s female backup group Wonderlove. While with Wonder, Maysa was a vocalist on the Jungle Fever soundtrack, and performed on numerous television shows including The Arsenio Hall Show, Oprah and The Tonight Show.

It was during an over-the-telephone audition in the early 1990s that Maysa became a member of the British jazz/funk/R&B band Incognito and, in 1992, she relocated to London and recorded Tribes, Vibes & Scribes, featuring the hit single "Don't You Worry 'Bout A Thing". Since then, Maysa has appeared on over seven Incognito recordings.

Maysa recorded her self-titled debut in 1995, followed by her second album All My Life in 2000, then Out of the Blue (2002), Smooth Sailing (2004), Sweet Classic Soul (2006), and Feel the Fire (2007).  In 2008, Metamorphosis peaked at No. 1 on  Billboard's Top Contemporary Jazz top 100 chart and No. 13 on Top R&B/Hip-Hop Albums.  In 2010, A Woman in Love, Maysa's 8th solo CD, debuted at No. 1 on the Contemporary Jazz Charts.  Maysa's 9th solo album, Motions of Love, released in November 2011, debuted at No. 1 on Billboard`s Contemporary Jazz Chart and Number 7 on the R&B charts.

Maysa has also collaborated with well-known jazz performers like Gerald Veasley, Rick Braun, Will Downing, Jason Miles' Soul Summit, Rhythm Logic, Jonathan Butler, and Pieces of a Dream.

In 2009, Maysa won the very first new Soul Train Award named for the brand's new owners, CENTRIC, The Centric Award: Soul Approved/Underground.

Maysa was a spokesperson in relation to respiratory syncytial virus (RSV), a disease that can be fatal to premature babies. She appears in RSV PSA commercials, with her son Jazz, sponsored for the March of Dimes.

Personal life
Maysa continues to live in Baltimore. She has a son named Jazz.

Discography

Albums

References

External links
Official website

1966 births
Living people
20th-century American singers
21st-century American singers
Musicians from Baltimore
Singers from Maryland
Morgan State University alumni
20th-century African-American women singers
American women jazz singers
American jazz singers
Smooth jazz singers
American contraltos
20th-century American women singers
21st-century American women singers
American contemporary R&B singers
American soul singers
Ballad musicians
Jazz musicians from Maryland
Incognito (band) members
21st-century African-American women singers